The 2017 Uruguay Open was a professional tennis tournament played on clay courts. It was the thirteenth edition of the tournament which was part of the 2017 ATP Challenger Tour. It took place in Montevideo, Uruguay between November 6 and 12, 2017.

Singles main-draw entrants

Seeds

 1 Rankings are as of 30 October 2017.

Other entrants
The following players received wildcards into the singles main draw:
  Martín Cuevas
  Pablo Cuevas
  Santiago Maresca
  João Pedro Sorgi

The following player received entry into the singles main draw using a protected ranking:
  Alejandro González

The following players received entry from the qualifying draw:
  Pedro Cachín
  Juan Pablo Ficovich
  José Hernández-Fernández
  Juan Ignacio Londero

Champions

Singles

 Pablo Cuevas def.  Gastão Elias 6–4, 6–3.

Doubles

 Romain Arneodo /  Fernando Romboli def.  Ariel Behar /  Fabiano de Paula 2–6, 6–4, [10–8].

External links
Official Website

2017 ATP Challenger Tour
2017
2017 in Uruguayan tennis